The Canton of Merville is a former cantons in the Dunkirk arrondissement of the Nord department of the Nord-Pas-de-Calais region, in northern France. It had 25,467 inhabitants (2012). It was disbanded following the French canton reorganisation which came into effect in March 2015.

Municipalities
It comprised 6 communes:
Estaires
Haverskerque
La Gorgue
Le Doulieu
Merville (chief town)
Neuf-Berquin

Politics
Its conseiller général from 2001- 2008 was Josette Fruchart (UPN / UMP, also mayor of Estaires), and from 2008 to 2014 it was Jacques Parent (PS).

References

Merville
2015 disestablishments in France
States and territories disestablished in 2015